William Jack (1768–1854) was a Church of Scotland academic who served as Principal of King's College, Aberdeen and formed part of the committee that created the University of Aberdeen by merging Aberdeen's two colleges, King's College and Marischal College.

Life

Jack was born on 12 May 1768, the son of William Jack, minister of Northmavine on Shetland, by his wife Margaret Bruce. He was educated at King's College, Aberdeen, graduating MA in 1785. He then spent some years at Edinburgh University studying Medicine and graduating MD, afterwards returning to King's College in 1788. He was appointed a "regent" (Fellow) in 1794. He became Sub-Principal in 1800 and Principal in 1815 in place of Roderick MacLeod.

He died on 9 February 1854 and is buried in a niche of the outer eastern enclosure at St Machar's Cathedral in north Aberdeen. Due to the impending merge his post as Principal was not filled. Although Jack did not live to see the merge, he was part of the committee set up to combine King's College with Marischal College to create the single entity of Aberdeen University in 1860.

Family
In April 1794 he was married to Grace Bolt (1773–1850), daughter of the merchant Andrew Bolt of Lerwick.

Jack had at least ten children, and several died in tragic circumstances:

William Jack (1795–1822), botanist, died in Sumatra
Charles Jack (born 1797)
Eliza Jane (Jean) Jack (born 1799), married Sir Arthur Nicolson, 8th Baronet, of Lasswade
Margaret (1801–1828)
Robert Jack (1803–1874)
Alexander Jack (1805–1857), killed in the Cawnpore Massacre
Grace Jack (1808–1828), died at Clifton
Margaret Janet (1810–1895), married James Hay of London
Mary Jesse (1809–1895)
Andrew Thomas William Jack (1822–1857), killed in the Cawnpore Massacre

References
 

1768 births
1854 deaths
People from Shetland
Alumni of the University of Aberdeen
Academics of the University of Aberdeen